Leroy Joe is a former Cook Islands international rugby league footballer who played as a  in the 1990s, 2000s and 2010s. He played at club level in England for Whitehaven (League 1), and Hull Kingston Rovers.

Background
Joe was born in New Zealand.

He is of Cook Islands descent.

Playing career
While playing for the Otahuhu Leopards in 1994 Joe was selected to represent New Zealand Māori at the Pacific Cup.

In 1995 he played for the Counties Manukau Heroes in the Lion Red Cup.

He is a former Otahuhu Leopards junior and has represented the Cook Islands, including at the 2000 World Cup.

References

External links
Statistics at rugbyleagueproject.org

Living people
Cook Islands national rugby league team players
Counties Manukau rugby league team players
Expatriate rugby league players in England
Hull Kingston Rovers players
New Zealand expatriate rugby league players
New Zealand expatriate sportspeople in England
New Zealand Māori rugby league team players
New Zealand sportspeople of Cook Island descent
Otahuhu Leopards players
Rugby league halfbacks
Whitehaven R.L.F.C. players
Year of birth missing (living people)